Lothar Meggendorfer (6 November 1847 in Munich – 7 July 1925 in Munich) was a German illustrator and early cartoonist known for his pop-up books.

He was first published in 1862 in the Fliegende Blätter, an illustrated comic weekly, and from 1868 in the bi-weekly Münchener Bilderbogen. He was the publisher of Meggendorfer-Blätter, an art and satirical magazine, from 1888 to 1905. He also illustrated a number of books with text by Julius Beck, among them Neues Struwwelpeterbuch published by J.F. Schreiber in the 1890s, and created some 40 board games.

Every other year, the Movable Book Society awards a pop-up book prize named after Meggendorfer.

Early life and education
Lorthar Meggendorfer, born in 1847 to Johann Nepomuk Meggendorfer and his second wife, Karoline Sichener, was the youngest of his father’s twenty-five children. His father, Johann, died in 1860. Meggendorfer began studying art at the Academy of Arts in 1862 and earned money for his education by playing the zither.

Meggendorfer was a student of the Munich-based actor and puppeteer Joseph Schmid, who was also known as “Papa Schmid”. The puppet actions would later influence Meggendorfer’s artwork.

Illustrator
Meggendorfer started working at the humor journal Fliegende Blätter (Flying Leaves), an illustrated comic weekly, in 1866. Others on staff included a former teacher, Wilhelm von Diez, and illustrators Wilhelm Busch, Caspar Braun, Max Haider, Eduard Ille, Ludwig von Negal, Adolf Oberlander, Franz von Pocci, Arpad Schmidhammer, and Moritz von Schwind.

Meggendorfer also illustrated for the bi-weekly Münchener Bilderbogen (Munich Pictures) published by Braun & Schneider.

Paper Engineer
Researchers have noted that Meggendorfer explored ways to make his illustrations move. His first movable picture book, Lebende Bilder (Living Pictures), as a Christmas gift to his eldest son, Adolph. Braun & Schneider published the book in 1878.

Meggendorfer’s movable books were translated and sold not only in Germany but Belgium, Czechoslovakia, England, France, Hungary, Russia, Spain and the United States.

Family
Meggendorfer married Elise Roedel in 1873. They had six children, two sons and four daughters. From 1891 to 1901 the family lived on a farm on the Jägerhaus estate in Bad Kohlgrub, Upper Bavaria. The family were also musically inclined. Meggendorfer played the contra-guitar. Elise played the piano and the children various string instruments.

Additional Reading
 Hildegard Krahé: Lothar Meggendorfers Spielwelt . Heinrich Hugendubel Verlag München 1983, 
 Lothar Meggendorfers Lebende Bilderbücher. Katalog zur Ausstellung des Puppentheatermuseums im Münchener Stadtmuseum 11. Dezember 1980 – 28. Februar 1981, Eigenverlag München
 Lothar Meggendorfer - Annotiertes Werkverzeichnis; Bücher und verwandte Druckwerke, Spiele, Modellierbogen ; Bibliography; books and related printings, games, cut-out sheets. Bearbeitet von Georg Friedrich und Reinhilde von Katzenheim. edition comboxx, Berlin - Wien - Zürich 2012, Catalogues raisonnés, 395 pages. In German and English.
 Helmut Herbst: Die Illustrationen der "Meggendorfer Blätter. In: Oberbayrisches Archiv Band 106 Seite 7 – 228, Verlag des Historischen Vereins von Oberbayern 1982, München
 Doris von Senger: Lothar Meggendorfer und die Meggendorfer Blätter. Dissertation München 1938

Selected works

References

External links

 Toy and Movable (T&M) Books — instruction regarding use of the Library of Congress Subject Heading for current acquisitions
 
Meggendorfer-Album (Digitalisat)
Münchener Kasperl-Theater (München 1879, Digitalisat)
Nimm mich mit! Ein lehrreiches Bilderbuch (München 1926, Digitalisat)
Lothar Meggendorfer at University of North Texas Libraries

1847 births
1925 deaths
German cartoonists
Pop-up book artists
German magazine founders